Sonokong Co, Ltd. (hangul: 손오공주식회사) is a Korean toy/game entertainment company. It was established in 1974. The corporate headquarters are located in Sugung-dong Guro-gu Seoul, Korea. The technical license of the company is owned by Takara and Hasbro.

History
The firm began in 1974 participating in Hyeopseong Industry. In 1985 Seoul Chemical was established. In 1996 the company was renamed from Seoul Chemical to Sonokong. In 2016 the firm's exclusivity agreement with Takara Tomy expired. Twelve percent of the company was sold to Mattel.

Products
Robots
Dolls
Model Cars
Games
Gaming Software
Motion Picture Entertainment
Trade Card Games
Yonggary

Animation
Jang Geum's Dream (with Munhwa Broadcasting Corporation)
K-Cops
Transformers (with Hasbro)
Beyblade (Korean name is Top Blade, with Seoul Broadcasting System (SBS) and TV Tokyo)
B-Daman
Battle Beadman & Fire Beadman (with Korean Broadcasting System (KBS) and Heewon Entertainment)
Bumperking Zapper (with Daewon C&A Holdings and SBS (Korea))
Vroomiz (SamG Animation)
Speed Storm (with SBS)
Track City (with SBS)
The White Dog (with SBS)
Turning Mecard (with KBS and Heewon Entertainment)
Road To Friendship (MBC)
Dragon Rising (MBC)
Animal Academy (MBC)
Hello Carbot (with Choirock Contents Factory) 
Miniforce (SamG Animation)
Legendary Detective (Netflix)
Choro The Pro Fighter (Netflix)

See also
Economy of South Korea

References

External links
Sonokong Homepage 
Sonokong Homepage 

Manufacturing companies based in Seoul
Game manufacturers
Hasbro
Entertainment companies of South Korea
Toy companies established in 1974
Toy companies of South Korea
South Korean companies established in 1974